Elizeth Moreira Cardoso (sometimes listed as Elisete Cardoso) (July 16, 1920 – May 7, 1990), was a singer and actress of great renown in Brazil.

Biography
Cardoso was born in Rio de Janeiro; her father was a serenader who played guitar, and her mother was an amateur singer. Elizeth began working at an early age and between 1930 and 1935 was a store clerk and hairdresser among other things. She was discovered by Jacob do Bandolim at her 16th birthday party, to which he was brought by her cousin Pedro, a popular figure among the musicians of the day. Jacó took her to Rádio Guanabara where, in spite of her father's initial opposition, she appeared on the Programa Suburbano with Vicente Celestino, Araci de Almeida, Moreira da Silva, Noel Rosa and Marília Batista on August 18, 1936. The week after she was hired by the station to appear on a weekly program. Following this, she continued to perform on various shows with multiple radio stations. In the 1960s she had her own radio show.

Due to her low pay, in 1939 she began to perform at clubs, movie theaters and other venues. She met with considerable success and her popularity increased significantly. In 1950, thanks to the support of Ataulfo Alves, she recorded Braços vazios (Acir Alves and Edgard G. Alves) and Mensageiro da saudade (Ataulfo Alves and José Batista), but the album was unsuccessful. Her next recording, also in 1950, met with popular approval. The album included Canção de amor (Chocolate and Elano de Paula), and the samba Complexo (Wilson Batista). The great success of Canção de amor led her, in 1951, to appear on the first television program in Rio de Janeiro on TV Tupi and helped launch her film career. She appeared in Coração materno, by Gilda de Abreu, and Watson Macedo’s É fogo na roupa.

In 1958, Cardoso was invited by Vinicius de Moraes to be the singer of an album of songs written by himself and Tom Jobim. Canção do Amor Demais became the first album of bossa nova music, launching the new genre. The album was released on the Festa label. While Cardoso was not primarily considered a bossa nova singer, she is the vocalist on the original version of the bossa classic Manhã de Carnaval from the Orfeu Negro soundtrack.

Elizeth continued to sing and act with great success until her death. By the end of her life she had released well over 40 albums in Brazil, Portugal and other countries. During almost seven decades of artistic life, she interpreted many forms of music, but her base was always sambaed, which she performed with great personality, and which earned her nicknames such as: A Noiva do Samba-Canção (the Bride of Samba), Lady do Samba, A Magnifica (the Magnificent One), and the one most connected with her name, A Divina (the Divine One).

Cardoso died of cancer at the age of 69.

Tribute
On July 16, 2021, Google celebrated her 101st birthday with a Google Doodle.

Discography

Compilation albums
 Raízes do Samba

References

External links
[ All Music]
 +  History of BOSSA NOVA with audio and video samples, by ABDB

1920 births
1990 deaths
Bossa nova singers
Brazilian contraltos
Música Popular Brasileira singers
Musicians from Rio de Janeiro (city)
Samba musicians
20th-century Brazilian women singers
20th-century Brazilian singers
Deaths from cancer in Brazil
Women in Latin music